Windstream Kentucky West LLC is a Windstream operating company providing local telephone services to small portions of Kentucky.

History
Windstream Kentucky West was established in 1954. It was acquired by Alltel and changed its name to ALLTEL Kentucky, Inc.. 

In 2002, Alltel acquired Verizon's operations in Kentucky formerly part of Verizon South and founded Kentucky ALLTEL for assets originally owned by GTE.

In 2006, the company was renamed Windstream Kentucky West, Inc., following the sale of Alltel's wireline assets to Valor Telecom. Valor renamed itself Windstream.

In 2007, the company became a limited liability company, LLC service providers.

As of 2012, the company has 23 employees and operates 27,000 lines in 5 exchanges.

References

Communications in Kentucky
Windstream Communications
Telecommunications companies of the United States
2001 establishments in Kentucky
American companies established in 2001
Telecommunications companies established in 1954